The Griffith Nunataks are a group of rock exposures on the south side of Balchen Glacier between the O'Connor Nunataks and Mount Perkins, in the Ford Ranges of Marie Byrd Land, Antarctica. They were discovered by the United States Antarctic Service in aerial flights over this area in 1940, and named for Clyde W. Griffith, a machinist and tractor operator of this expedition.

References

Nunataks of Marie Byrd Land